Unionville High School may refer to several high schools:

 Unionville High School (Ontario), in Unionville, Ontario, Canada
 Unionville High School (Kennett Square, Pennsylvania), in the United States